Kondakovka is a rural locality (a selo) in Vatazhensky Selsoviet, Krasnoyarsky District, Astrakhan Oblast, Russia. The population was 112 as of 2010. There are 4 streets.

Geography 
Kondakovka is located 8 km east of Krasny Yar (the district's administrative centre) by road. Vatazhnoye is the nearest rural locality.

References 

Rural localities in Krasnoyarsky District, Astrakhan Oblast